The proposed 1995 British F2 Championship was to be run to a one-make formula, using a slightly modified Reynard 95D fitted with a Cosworth DFY engine. The championship was cancelled at the end of May as it had only one confirmed entry from Madgwick International.

Drivers and teams
The following drivers and teams were entered for the 1995 British Formula Two Championship.

Calendar

British Formula Two Championship 
The following calendar was intended to be run before the season's cancellation.

References

Formula 3000
British Formula 3000 Championship
British Formula Two Championship